Nicholas Kahl is an attorney and Democratic politician from Oregon. He served in the Oregon House of Representatives from 2009 to 2011. He is a practicing lawyer in Portland, Oregon.

Early life and education
Kahl was born in East Multnomah County, Oregon and  raised in Portland, Oregon. He graduated from David Douglas High School and attended Mt. Hood Community College. He graduated from Portland State University in 2000 with a Bachelor of Music in Jazz Studies.

At the time of his election to the Oregon Legislature, he was a second-year student at Lewis & Clark Law School. He graduated with a Juris Doctor in 2009.

Political career
Kahl worked as staff assistant for Multnomah County Commissioner chair Jeff Cogen.

In the 2008 Oregon legislative elections, he was elected to the Oregon House of Representatives representing District 49 in Multnomah County, specifically the cities of Fairview, Troutdale, Wood Village, and a portion of Gresham. Kahl was the East Portland representative and transportation committee co-chair.

He ran for re-election in 2010 but was defeated by Republican Matt Wand.

Legal career 
Kahl is a trial lawyer and owns a law practice in Portland, Oregon. His litigation practice focuses on catastrophic injury, toxic torts, race discrimination, consumer protection, class actions, and other complex litigation. He represents consumers, injured people, and small business owners.

Nick Kahl is an adjunct law professor at Lewis and Clark Law School.

References 

Politicians from Portland, Oregon
Living people
Lewis & Clark Law School alumni
Members of the Oregon House of Representatives
David Douglas High School alumni
Portland State University alumni
Mt. Hood Community College alumni
21st-century American politicians
1977 births